In descriptive complexity, a query is a mapping from structures of one signature to structures of another vocabulary.  Neil Immerman, in his book Descriptive Complexity, "use[s] the concept of query as the fundamental paradigm of computation" (p. 17).

A query is then any mapping

Computational complexity theory can then be phrased in terms of the power of the mathematical logic necessary to express a given query.

Order-independent queries

A query is order-independent if the ordering of objects in the structure does not affect the results of the query. In databases, these queries correspond to generic queries (Immerman 1999, p. 18).

References

Descriptive complexity